Juan Cánovas Ortega is a Spanish short story writer and poet. He was born in 1961 in Tarrasa and studied Modern History at the Universidad Autónoma de Barcelona, where he later worked as an administrator. He has won a number of literary prizes.

Prizes
 Certamen de Poesía Viernes Culturales de Cerdanyola del Vallés
 Premio Joaquín Benito Lucas de Talavera de la Reina 
 Concurso de Poesía 'Tostón o Cochinillo de Arévalo'
 Certamen de Poesía Amorosa Noctiluca de Rincón de la Victoria
 Ciudad de Huelva de Relatos
 José Calderón Escalada de Reinosa de cuentos 
 Concurso de Cuentos La Felguera 
 Juan José Relosillas de Málaga de relatos, 
 'Vida y Salud' de relatos de la Universidad de Alicante
 Ciudad de Mula de cuentos
 Gerald Brenan de relato breve de Alhaurín el Grande
 Salvador García Jiménez de Chegín de cuentos
 Villa de Fuente Álamo de narraciones cortas
 Ciudad de Sant Andreu de la Barca de relato en castellano
 (finalist) Premio de narrativa breve by the la Fundación de Ferrocarriles Españoles.

References

1961 births
Short story writers from Catalonia
20th-century Spanish poets
Living people
20th-century short story writers